is a station on the Hankyu Senri Line in Suita, Osaka Prefecture, Japan, operated by the private railway operator Hankyu.

Lines
Senriyama Station is served by the 13.6 km Hankyu Senri Line.

Adjacent stations

History
The station opened on 26 October 1921.

See also
 List of railway stations in Japan

References

External links
  

Railway stations in Osaka Prefecture
Railway stations in Japan opened in 1921